Between 25–28 September 2019, Pune, India, and its division received a heavy amount of rainfall which caused flash flooding. In addition to people lost to these floods, other rain-related incidents such as collapsed compound walls of buildings have killed at least 21 people. Three NDRF teams along with the Army was deployed in the district for rescue operations.

Background
The monsoon season in south Asia typically starts around early June each year and brings heavy rainfall and potential flooding to nation. However, the 2019 monsoon season started in late June and has been unusually heavy in terms of rainfall, with a 6.5% increase in rainfall averaged across India. In the Pune district, prior to the flooding, it had received 180% of its annual rainfall for the year due to the monsoon season, and its local Khadakwasla dam along with other three important dams were filled completely.

Flooding 
Coupled with the existing rain from the previous months, flash floods started to occur. The flash flooding was caused by short intense periods of rainfall that overwhelmed water runoff systems like nullahs and flooded roads.

Similarly, the Nazare Dam near Saswad was also at capacity, and its waters were released at a rate of  into the Karha river late on night of 25 September, inundating areas of Purandar and Baramati.

Relief and rescue 
Two teams of NDRF were employed in the Pune city and two teams were employed in the Baramati. The flood caused 21 deaths, 5 missing and evacuation of more than 28,000 people living in the city.

See also 

 2019 Vadodara flood

References 

Floods in India
2019 disasters in India
History of Pune
2010s in Maharashtra
Events in Pune